Garzena is an Italian surname. Notable people with the surname include:

Bruno Garzena (born 1933), Italian footballer
Edoardo Garzena (1900–1984), Italian boxer
Víctor García Garzena (1913–1986), Chilean lawyer

See also
Gardena (disambiguation)

Italian-language surnames